James William Corbett (25 August 1928, Manhattan – 25 April 1994, Albany, New York) was a solid-state physicist.

He received his bachelor's degree from the University of Missouri and his Ph.D. from Yale University in 1955. Beginning in 1955 he was a research associate at the General Electric Research Laboratory in Schenectady, New York. During the 1960s as an adjunct professor at Rensselaer Polytechnic Institute, he was a co-founder and director of Rensselaer's Joint Laboratories for Advanced Materials. His 1966 book Electron Radiation Damage in Semiconductors and Metals was highly esteemed. In 1968 he joined the faculty of the University at Albany, SUNY. For the academic year 1975–1976 he was a Guggenheim Fellow. He was an associate editor of the Elsevier journal Materials Letters.

At G.E. his research involved early pioneering studies of the effects of electron irradiation on metals and semiconductors.

 
Upon his death, he was survived by his wife, M. E. Grenander, and two sons. In 1999 a bequest of $1.5 million from M. E. Grenander funded the James W. Corbett Distinguished Professorship in Physics at the University at Albany, SUNY.

References

External links

1928 births
1994 deaths
University at Albany, SUNY faculty
University of Missouri alumni
Yale University alumni
20th-century American physicists
University of Missouri physicists
Fellows of the American Physical Society